Rough Edges is the seventh album and sixth studio album by Ben E. King.  After not making any new albums for a few years, King released this album with Maxwell, a subsidiary of Atlantic Records.  This would be the only full-length LP released on Maxwell, with King transferring to Mandala in 1972.

Tracks 1, 3 and 5 are not medleys but (what are now known as) mash-ups, where he goes back and forth between each song throughout the track.

Track listing

"She Lets Her Hair Down (Early in the Morning)"/"Little Green Apples" (Leon Carr, Paul Vance)/(Bobby Russell) (9:26)
"Wishing For Tomorrow" (Bob Crewe) (5:51)
"If You've Gotta Make a Fool of Somebody"/"Come Together" (Rudy Clark)/(John Lennon, Paul McCartney) (5:02)
"One Man" (Bob Crewe, Larry Brown) (6:25)
"In The Midnight Hour"/"Lay Lady Lay" (Steve Cropper, Wilson Pickett)/(Bob Dylan) (6:06)
"Don't Let Me Down" (John Lennon, Paul McCartney) (5:43)
"Tonight I'll Be Staying Here with You" (Bob Dylan) (5:10)

Ben E. King albums
1970 albums
Albums produced by Bob Crewe
Atlantic Records albums